Ilya Sergeyevich Leshukov (born 27 December 1995) is a Russian beach volleyball player. As of 2018, he plays with Konstantin Semenov. They qualified for 2020 Summer Olympics in Tokyo.

References

External links
 
 
 
 

1995 births
Living people
Russian beach volleyball players
Sportspeople from Yekaterinburg
Beach volleyball players at the 2020 Summer Olympics